Rutilograptis is a genus of moths belonging to the family Tortricidae.

Species
Rutilograptis cornesi Razowski, 1981
Rutilograptis couteauxi (Ghesquire, 1940)

See also
List of Tortricidae genera

References

  2005: World Catalogue of Insects vol. 5 Tortricidae.
 , 1981: Acta zool. cracov. 25: 321.
 , 2013: Accessions to the Afrotropical fauna of Tortricidae (Lepidoptera), 2. Polish Journal of Entomology, 82 (3): 159–174. Abstract and full article: 
 , 2010: An annotated catalogue of the types of Tortricidae (Lepidoptera) in the collection of the Royal Museum for Central Africa (Tervuren, Belgium) with descriptions of new genera and new species. Zootaxa 2469: 1-77. Abstract: .

External links
Tortricid.net

Tortricini
Tortricidae genera